The 3 '''arrondissements of the Seine-Maritime department are:
 Arrondissement of Dieppe, (subprefecture: Dieppe) with 343 communes. The population of the arrondissement was 237,203 in 2016.
 Arrondissement of Le Havre, (subprefecture: Le Havre) with 149 communes.  The population of the arrondissement was 387,520 in 2016.
 Arrondissement of Rouen, (prefecture of the Seine-Maritime department: Rouen) with 216 communes. The population of the arrondissement was 631,032 in 2016.

History

In 1800 the arrondissements of Rouen, Dieppe, Le Havre, Neufchâtel and Yvetot were established. The arrondissements of Neufchâtel and Yvetot were disbanded in 1926. 

The borders of the arrondissements of Seine-Maritime were modified in January 2017:
 four communes from the arrondissement of Dieppe to the arrondissement of Rouen
 12 communes from the arrondissement of Le Havre to the arrondissement of Dieppe
 seven communes from the arrondissement of Le Havre to the arrondissement of Rouen
 four communes from the arrondissement of Rouen to the arrondissement of Dieppe

References

Seine-Maritime